CFMI-FM (branded as Rock 101) is a Canadian radio station in the Metro Vancouver region of British Columbia. It broadcasts at 101.1 MHz on the FM band with an effective radiated power of 100,000 watts (peak) from a transmitter on Mount Seymour in the District of North Vancouver. Owned by Corus Entertainment, the studios are located in Downtown Vancouver, in the TD Tower. The station has a classic hits format.

History
CFMI first signed on in early 1970. Over the years, the station added FM transmitters in most of British Columbia. On July 26, 2011, CFMI received Canadian Radio-television and Telecommunications Commission (CRTC) approval by increasing New Westminster's transmitter to the average effective radiated power (ERP) from 37,000 to 53,000 watts (maximum ERP from 75,000 to 100,000 watts), by decreasing the effective height of antenna above average terrain from 686 to 386.4 meters and by relocating its transmitter.

HD Programming
On October 13, 2015, CFMI-HD was launched as the first Canadian HD service west of Ontario:  
HD2 carries sister station CKNW AM 980.
HD3 carries sister station CKGO AM 730; this began on July 3, 2016 due to AM730's transmitter being damaged by the 2016 Burns Bog fire.

Overview
The station signed on with a very-short-lived country format. This was followed by a light-popular music format ("pop for adults"). CFMI was distinguished in its earlier years by being a technical innovator of early automation systems. Stereo automation systems of the day relied heavily on reel-to-reel tape machines for music. CFMI's automation had no reel machines, but relied totally on cartridge carousels, which allowed greater programming flexibility ("random access"), but no broadcast cartridges of the day could reproduce quality stereo. The response of CFMI's engineers was to invent a new cartridge that could: the Aristocart. Parent company Western International Communications went on to develop a manufacturing division, exporting these improved cartridges to broadcasters around the world. Today's broadcasters use computer systems with large hard drives to reproduce music digitally, and have no need of tape systems. But in its heyday (circa 1975-1990), the Aristocart was an improvement to a technical problem shared by all commercial stereo broadcasters.

Among CFMI's programming innovations was Discumentary, a one-hour musical documentary of programming featuring a particular artist or a particular theme. This was developed in response to the CRTC's requirement for foreground programming. The Discumentary programs were written by Paul Wiggins and voiced by Dave McCormick, then Terry David Mulligan and syndicated throughout Canada, and broadcast internationally on the Anik D satellite. Later, CRTC regulations phased out the need for foreground programming, and CFMI phased out Discumentary.

Rebroadcasters
CFMI also operates on a number of low-power FM transmitters.

Alberta

British Columbia

Newfoundland and Labrador

Saskatchewan

References

External links
 Rock 101
 
 

Fmi
Fmi
Fmi
Radio stations established in 1970
1970 establishments in British Columbia